Katariina Lahti (born 13 October 1949) is a Finnish film director and screenwriter. She directed eight films between 1976 and 1986. Her 1976 film Antti the Treebranch was entered into the 10th Moscow International Film Festival.

Selected filmography
 Antti the Treebranch (1976)

References

External links

1949 births
Living people
People from Savonlinna
Finnish screenwriters
Finnish film directors
Finnish women film directors
Finnish women screenwriters